Joško Gluić (born September 23, 1951) is a Yugoslavian former footballer who played as a midfielder for HNK Hajduk Split, Go Ahead Eagles, AFC Ajax, Grazer AK and Olimpija Ljubljana during his career.

Club career
Gluić began his career in 1969 with HNK Hajduk Split with whom he won the Yugoslav First League championship in 1971, as well as the Yugoslav Cup in 1972 and 1973. In 1973, he had a loan spell in the National Soccer League with Toronto Croatia. Afterwards he moved to the Netherlands, where he played 42 matches for Go Ahead Eagles scoring 14 goals. In 1976, he transferred to AFC Ajax, where he played in 9 matches without scoring. In the 1977/78 season, he played for Grazer AK in Austria, and then played for Olimpija Ljubljana in the 1978-1979 season, making three appearances that season, before retiring.

References

External links
 

1951 births
Living people
Association football midfielders
Yugoslav footballers
HNK Hajduk Split players
Toronto Croatia players
Go Ahead Eagles players
AFC Ajax players
Grazer AK players
NK Olimpija Ljubljana (1945–2005) players
Yugoslav First League players
Canadian National Soccer League players
Eredivisie players
Austrian Football Bundesliga players
Yugoslav expatriate footballers
Expatriate soccer players in Canada
Yugoslav expatriate sportspeople in Canada
Expatriate footballers in the Netherlands
Yugoslav expatriate sportspeople in the Netherlands
Expatriate footballers in Austria
Yugoslav expatriate sportspeople in Austria